Juan Carlos Villamayor (born 5 March 1969) is a former Paraguayan football player.

Club statistics

National team statistics

References

External links

1969 births
Living people
Paraguayan footballers
Paraguayan expatriate footballers
Paraguay international footballers
1993 Copa América players
1995 Copa América players
1997 Copa América players
Cerro Porteño players
Sport Colombia footballers
Rayo Vallecano players
Chacarita Juniors footballers
Sport Club Corinthians Paulista players
Associação Atlética Ponte Preta players
Expatriate footballers in Argentina
Expatriate footballers in Brazil
Expatriate footballers in Spain
Expatriate footballers in Japan
Paraguayan Primera División players
Argentine Primera División players
J1 League players
Avispa Fukuoka players
Association football defenders